Markus Miessen (born in Bonn, 1978) is a German architect and writer.

Education and teaching
Miessen received his bachelor's degree from the Glasgow School of Art (BArch), continuing his studies at the Architectural Association in London (AADiplHons) and at the London Consortium (MRes). His PhD was completed at the Centre for Research Architecture at Goldsmiths (London) in 2015 under the supervision of Eyal Weizman.

From 2011 to 2016 Miessen held the position of Distinguished Professor in Practice at the University of Southern California, USC (Los Angeles). 

Other teaching positions include Professor at HDK-Valand, Academy of Art and Design, University of Gothenburg (Sweden 2016–2020), Stiftungsprofessur for Critical Spaces Practice at the Städelschule (Frankfurt 2011–2013), guest professor at HEAD (Geneva), visiting professor at the Hochschule für Gestaltung (Karlsruhe) at the Berlage Institute (Rotterdam), and Unit Master at the Architectural Association (London 2004–2008). The Winter School Middle East was initiated by Miessen in 2008. He became a Harvard GSD Fellow in 2010.

Since 2021, he is Professor of Urban Regeneration at the University of Luxembourg, where he holds the Chair of the City of Esch, associated with the master programme "Architecture, European Urbanisation, Globalisation'.

Work

Studio Miessen was founded in London in 2005 and has been based in Berlin since 2008, working on architectural and spatial design projects in Europe, North America, the Middle East and Asia. The studio has worked with institutional clients and collaborators such as Art Basel (Switzerland), Art Sonje Center (South Korea), b-05 Art & Cultural Centre (Germany), e-flux (USA), Government of Slovenia, Haus der Kulturen der Welt (Germany), the Serpentine Gallery (UK), Witte de With (The Netherlands), Weltkulturen Museum (Germany), Institute of Modern Art (Australia), Kunstverein in Hamburg (Germany), Biennials such as the Gwangju Biennale (2011), Performa (2009, 2011, 2013), Sydney Biennial (2016), Berlin Biennale (2016), Venice Biennale (2013), Istanbul Biennale (2014) and artists such as Hito Steyerl, Dénes Farkas, Liam Gillick, Flaka Haliti, Slater Bradley and Stefanos Tsivopoulos.

In 2006 Miessen and Hans Ulrich Obrist founded the Brutally Early Club., conducting conversational, salon-type meetings in post-public spaces at 6:30 AM in originally in London and later in Berlin, New York City and Paris.

Markus Miessen has authored books such as Crossbenching (2016, Sternberg Press), and The Nightmare of Participation (2010, Sternberg Press).

In collaboration with Nikolaus Hirsch, Markus Miessen initiated and edits the Critical Spatial Practice book series at Sternberg Press, publishing contributors including Keller Easterling, Beatriz Colomina, Chantal Mouffe, Eyal Weizman, Felicity Scott, Metahaven, Armin Linke, Trevor Paglen, Rabih Mroué and Jill Magid.

Miessen has worked as a consultant to the Government of Slovenia during their presidency of the EU Council, The European Kunsthalle (Cologne), the Dutch Foundation for Art and Public Domain (SKOR) (Amsterdam), the Serpentine Gallery (London), the European Commission and the Kosova National Art Gallery.

In 2021, a monograph of the studio's work titled Cultures of Assembly will be published (Sternberg Press, MIT Press).

Selected books

2021 Cultures of Assembly, Berlin: Sternberg Press, Cambridge MA: MIT Press
2020 Para-Plattformen Die Raumpolitik des Rechtspopulismus, Berlin: Merve Verlag 
2019 Para-Platforms On the Spatial Politics of Right-Wing Populism, Berlin: Sternberg Press
2018 Perhaps It Is High Time for a Xeno-architecture to Match, Berlin: Sternberg Press
2018 14 Tage, Munich: Sorry Press
2018 (with Kenny Cupers) Spaces of Uncertainty Berlin Revisited, Basel: Birkhäuser
2016 Crossbenching, Berlin: Merve Verlag
2016 Crossbenching, Berlin: Sternberg Press
2015 (With Yann Chateigné) The Archive As a Productive Space Of Conflict, Berlin: Sternberg Press
2014 MOULD Cultures of Assembly, Milan: Mould Press
2012 Albtraum Partizipation, Berlin: Merve Verlag
2011 (with Andrea Phillips) Actors, Agents and Attendants Caring Culture: Art, Architecture and the Politics of Health, Berlin: Sternberg Press
2011 (with Patricia Reed, Kenny Cupers) Architectural Space as Agent, Fillip: Vancouver
2011 (with Nina Valerie Kolowratnik) Waking Up From The Nightmare of Participation, Utrecht: Expodium
2010 The Nightmare of Participation, Berlin: Sternberg Press
2009 (with Tina DiCarlo) When Economies Become Form, Rotterdam: Berlage Institute
2009 (Nikolaus Hirsch, Philipp Misselwitz, Matthias Görlich) Institution Building, Berlin: Sternberg Press
2008 East Coast Europe, Berlin: Sternberg Press
2007 The Violence of Participation, Berlin: Sternberg Press
2007 (with Shumon Basar, Antonia Carver) With/Without, Dubai: Bidoun
2006 (with Shumon Basar) Did Someone say Participate? An Atlas of Spatial Practice, Cambridge MA: MIT Press
2002 (with Kenny Cupers) Spaces of Uncertainty, Wuppertal: Müller+Busmann

References

External links
 Studio Miessen
 Winter School Middle East
 Critical Spatial Practice
 European Kunsthalle
 Mould Press
 Sternberg Press

1978 births
Alumni of the Architectural Association School of Architecture
People from Bonn
20th-century German architects
University of Southern California faculty
Living people
21st-century German architects